Kevin John Phillips (11 November 1928 – 21 September 2018) was an Australian rules footballer who played with Collingwood in the Victorian Football League (VFL).

Notes

External links 

1928 births
2018 deaths
Australian rules footballers from Victoria (Australia)
Collingwood Football Club players